Smiljana Marinović (born 25 September 1977 in Split) is an Olympic and national-record holding breaststroke swimmer from Croatia. She swam at the Olympics in 2000, 2004 and 2008. In July 2009, she set the Croatian Record in the long course 100 Breaststroke at 1:10.42.

She also swam for Croatia internationally at the 2003 and 2005 World Championships.

References

1977 births
Living people
Female breaststroke swimmers
Croatian female swimmers
Olympic swimmers of Croatia
Swimmers at the 2000 Summer Olympics
Swimmers at the 2004 Summer Olympics
Swimmers at the 2008 Summer Olympics
Sportspeople from Split, Croatia
21st-century Croatian women